Asmelash Geyesus (born 22 March 1968) is an Ethiopian former cyclist. He competed in two events at the 1992 Summer Olympics.

References

1968 births
Living people
Ethiopian male cyclists
Olympic cyclists of Ethiopia
Cyclists at the 1992 Summer Olympics
Place of birth missing (living people)